The Panhandle Bridge (officially the Monongahela River Bridge) carries two rail lines of the Port Authority "T" line across the Monongahela River in Pittsburgh, Pennsylvania.  The name comes from Pennsylvania Railroad subsidiary Pittsburgh, Cincinnati, Chicago and St. Louis Railroad, also known as the Panhandle Route, which operated over the bridge.

The basic structure was built in 1903, and was the third railroad bridge on the site since 1863. It was raised in 1912-14 as part of a grade separation project. The bridge's function was to carry Panhandle Route passenger, mail and express trains from Pennsylvania Station in Pittsburgh, with a tunnel in between the station and the bridge. Pennsy Panhandle freight trains utilized the Ohio Connecting Bridge slightly downstream on the Ohio River, or went the long way around the West Virginia Panhandle via Conway, Pennsylvania.

Rail traffic over the Panhandle Bridge declined as passenger trains were discontinued, and Amtrak became the only regular user of the bridge from 1971 to 1979, when the New York-St. Louis-Kansas City National Limited was discontinued on October 1 of that year. As PRR successor Conrail had no use for the bridge and the restrictive downtown tunnel, it was sold to the Port Authority, who rebuilt the bridge beginning in 1982 as part of the downtown light rail subway project, which removed trolleys from downtown streets and the Smithfield Street Bridge. PAT (as the Port Authority system was known at the time) light rail cars began using the bridge on July 7, 1985.

See also

List of crossings of the Monongahela River
Pittsburgh & Steubenville Extension Railroad Tunnel
Pittsburgh, Cincinnati, Chicago and St. Louis Railroad

References

External links

Panhandle Bridge on pghbridges.com

Bridges in Pittsburgh
Bridges over the Monongahela River
Bridges completed in 1903
Railroad bridges in Pennsylvania
Light rail bridges